 
Sutterton is a village and rural parish in the Boston District of Lincolnshire, England. The population of the Civil Parish at the 2011 census was 1,585.

Governance
The parish used to form part of the Boston Rural District, in the Parts of Holland. Holland was one of the three divisions  of the traditional County of Lincolnshire. Since the Local Government Act of 1888 Holland had been, in most respects, a county in itself.

The village is one of eighteen parishes which, together with Boston, form the Borough of Boston in Lincolnshire. Local governance has been arranged as such since the reorganization of 1 April 1974 resulting from the Local Government Act 1972. The parish forms part of the 'Five Villages' electoral ward. Sutterton parish church is dedicated to St Mary the Blessed Virgin.

Geography
The Spalding bypass opened as the 'Spalding-Sutterton Improvement' in 1995.

Community
Sutterton has a post office and general store, one public house and restaurant, a fish-and-chip shop, a garden centre, a veterinary practice, a
doctors' practice and a village hall used in conjunction with the primary school.
Close to the east is Algarkirk, with which Sutterton shares Sutterton Fourfields Primary School. Before 1970 the two villages also shared the Algarkirk and Sutterton railway station on the Spalding to Boston line, now next to the A16.

References

External links

"Sutterton" Genuki. Retrieved 10 April 2011

Villages in Lincolnshire
Civil parishes in Lincolnshire
Borough of Boston